The 2015 state visit of Xi Jinping to the United States, which was from September 22 to 28, 2015, was the state visit of China's paramount leader Xi Jinping to the United States. It was his seventh visit to the United States and his first visit after succeeding the General Secretary of the Chinese Communist Party in 2012. During the period of the visit, Xi attended the US–China Internet Industry Forum, visited the White House and met US President Barack Obama, and attended the 70th anniversary of the United Nations.

Background
Xi's visit occurred at a time of high tensions in China-US relations. The Wall Street Journal quoted experts who said Xi's US visit was to promote local technology companies and to ask the US government to not retaliate in response to accusations regarding the People's Republic of China having engaged in hacking activities, but Beijing has repeatedly denied the allegations of the United States. Chinese Foreign Minister Wang Yi said Xi's visit was to promote trust between the two countries.

Before this visit, the United States Congressional-Executive Commission on China held a hearing on human rights. Experts and members of Congress in attendance called on President Obama to ask Xi Jinping to stop the persecution of Tibetans, Uyghurs, religious groups, non-governmental organizations, intellectuals, democracy advocates, and supporters of "universal suffrage" in Hong Kong.

Xi had previously visited the United States six times. His first visit was as part of a corn industry delegation to the state of Iowa in 1985. His most recent visit in 2013 was informal, in which he went to Sunnylands in California, and met with US President Barack Obama.

Process

September 22: Arrival at Seattle and Speech Giving
On September 22, 2015, Xi Jinping, and his wife, Peng Liyuan, arrived at Paine Field and stepped off an Air China aircraft at about 9:30 am (Pacific Daylight Time). Before his arrival at the Westin Seattle Hotel, protesters gathered downtown to highlight the Chinese government's human rights abuses and to voice other concerns, including Falun Gong practitioners. Supporters of Xi were also present with Chinese flags. The protesters dispersed by 6:00 pm.

In the evening, Xi attended a banquet speech at the Westin Seattle Hotel, meeting with Washington Governor Jay Inslee, Mayor of Seattle Ed Murray, Senator Patty Murray, Congressman Rick Larsen, and former Ambassador to China Gary Locke. In his speech, he mentioned several contentious issues in China–US relations, including on cybersecurity and China's economy. Xi's speech cited elements of American culture, included Sleepless in Seattle and the poet Walt Whitman. He also talked about his teenage years working on a farm in Yanchuan County, Shaanxi, China, during the Cultural Revolution. He linked this to the Chinese Dream, an individual work ethic which would strengthen the Chinese nation as a whole. Xi reiterated that China is against currency wars and will not lower the renminbi rate to boost exports. On the topic of his anti-corruption reforms, Xi said, "It has nothing to do with a power struggle. In this case, there's no House of Cards" – a reference to the Netflix political drama, which tops the list of most illegally downloaded shows in China.

September 23: Visiting and meeting business executives in Seattle

On the second day of his trip, Xi visited Boeing Everett Factory and viewed the final assembly lines for the Boeing 787 Dreamliner, Boeing 777 and Boeing 747-8. Xi announced that China would buy 300 Boeing aircraft, included 250 single-aisle Boeing 737s and 50 widebody jets for US$38 billion. He also announced that Boeing would build its first non-US factory in Zhoushan, Zhejiang, China. The Chinese company Inspur and Cisco Systems said they will jointly sell networking technologies and products in China.

After his Boeing visit, Xi attended an Internet industry forum held at the headquarters of Microsoft, located in Redmond. He said China would prioritize Internet security and defended self-governance at the country level with respect to Internet regulations. Thirty US and Chinese technology executives attended this forum and posed for a photo with Xi and Chief of the State Internet Information Office Lu Wei, including Apple's CEO Tim Cook, Amazon.com's CEO Jeff Bezos, Alibaba's CEO Jack Ma, and Microsoft's CEO Satya Nadella. Executives from Google and Uber, did not appear in this photo. Before photographing, Facebook Chief Executive Mark Zuckerberg spoke to Xi in Mandarin. On September 21, The Washington Post reported that technology executives were recommended to attend this forum, or risk their companies facing greater regulatory scrutiny in China.

Xi also visited Microsoft, where he met with Bill and Melinda Gates as well as senior executives and board members of the company. He had the opportunity to preview new technologies being developed by Microsoft. Nadella gifted him a 3D printed model of the Liulinhai, the first Chinese ship to dock in the United States, in Seattle, in 1979 after the establishment of diplomatic relations between the US and the People's Republic of China.

In the afternoon, Xi Jinping visited Lincoln High School in Tacoma, Washington. He provided opportunities for students to experience Chinese music, government and culture. Lincoln's football players presented Xi with a Lincoln Abes jersey emblazoned with the number "1". Xi reciprocated with gifts of books and ping-pong equipment. He also invited 100 Lincoln High students to visit China in 2016. During this visit, the adherents of Falun Gong and Vietnamese protesters held up signs such as "Stop Red China's Violations" and shouted slogans such as "Down with Red China".

Xi attended a forum hosted by the Paulson Foundation, an economic think tank founded by Henry Paulson. He also attended a dinner organized by local Chinese.

September 24: Arrival at Washington D.C.
Xi and Peng left Seattle and flew to Washington, D.C. on September 24. They arrived at Joint Base Andrews and were greeted by United States Vice President Joe Biden. After greeting, a band played the US and Chinese national anthems. Then Xi and Obama had a private working dinner at the Blair House.

September 25: Meeting US President Barack Obama and State Dinner

On September 25, Xi Jinping arrived at the White House. President Barack Obama welcomed Xi's visit. After the welcoming ceremony, Xi and Obama held their discussion in the White House. During this discussion, they mentioned peacekeeping, nuclear security, health, environment, cybersecurity, law enforcement and counterterrorism. Xi said that China would develop a "national carbon emissions trading market" in 2017, as a part of climate change statement. Later they held a news conference at Rose Garden. Obama and Xi reached a "common understanding" that neither the United States nor China should engage in state-sponsored cyberintrusions, and they would together seek the rules for appropriate conduct in cyberspace.

In the evening, Obama held a state dinner for Xi Jinping. It was Obama's second state dinner for a Chinese President. The White House invited Anita Lo, an Asian-American chef, to serve as a guest chef and to design the menu with Chinese elements. This state dinner's guests included US technology executives Mark Zuckerberg, Tim Cook and Larry Ellison, as well as former Secretary of State Madeleine Albright. Obama said that China and the US together are "stronger when we accept the diversity of the views and the contributions and uphold the rights of all our people".

September 26: UN Sustainable Development Summit in New York
On September 26, Xi Jinping flew to New York City and attended the UN Sustainable Development Summit at the Headquarters of the United Nations. In his speech, he foresaw that "the world would seek an equitable, open, comprehensive and innovation-driven development path in an effort to achieve common development of all countries after 2015". He also announced the establishment of a South–South cooperation assistance fund. China will contribute US$2 billion to the fund to encourage developing countries to undertake the post-2015 development agenda. In addition, Xi has floated many important initiatives, such as the BRICS Development Bank, the Asian Infrastructure Investment Bank, and the Silk Road Fund.

September 27: Global  Women's Summit and Environmental issues
On September 27, Xi Jinping and United Nations Secretary General Ban Ki-moon co-hosted the "2015 Global Women's Summit". In his speech, Xi said, "As the Chinese people pursue a happy life, all Chinese women have the opportunity to excel in life and make their dreams come true". He also announced China would contribute US$10 million to UN Women. However, former Secretary of State Hillary Clinton criticized his attendance, considering women's rights abuses in China.

Peng Liyuan attended UNESCO's Special Envoy for the Advancement of Girls' and Women's Education. Peng spoke in English, the first time she showed her fluency in the language to a large gathering. She said her Chinese Dream is that "all children especially girls can have access to good education".

Xi also attended the Leaders Working Lunch on Climate Change of the UN. He said China will control greenhouse gas emissions and put "China's South–South Cooperation Fund on Climate Change" into operation.

September 28: Speech at UN General Assembly
Xi gave a speech at the General Debate of the 70th Session of the United Nations General Assembly. He mentioned the commemoration of the 70th anniversary of Victory over Japan Day of the Second World War in China and emphasized that commemorating history is not revenge. Xi also said all economies should be built on an eco-environment, and green, low-carbon circular sustainable development platform. He also pledged US$100 million, over a period of five years, to the African Union.

See also

China–United States relations
Foreign relations of China
Foreign relations of the United States

References

External links

Xi Jinping visit to the United States
Xi Jinping visit to the United States
Xi Jinping visit to the United States
Xi Jinping visit to the United States
Xi Jinping visit to the United States
Xi Jinping visit to the United States
China–United States relations
History of the foreign relations of the United States
Articles containing video clips
Xi Jinping
Xi Jinping visits